"Remote Control" and "Three MCs and One DJ" are songs by American hip-hop group Beastie Boys, from their fifth studio album, Hello Nasty. The two were released as a double A-side single, serving as Hello Nasty's fourth single.

"Three MCs and One DJ" features scratching by Mix Master Mike, and marks his debut song with the group. The single peaked at #21 on the UK Singles Chart.

"Remote Control" was used in a commercial for ESPN's Winter X Games XV featuring two talking deer.

Music video
The video for "Three MC's and One DJ" opens with Mike D, Ad-Rock and MCA posing in formation in the basement room of an apartment waiting for their DJ, Mix Master Mike. After a short while, he appears at the apartment's entrance door in a Ghostbuster costume. He rings the bell but the three do not move, so he has to wait for someone to exit the apartment to sneak in. Mike arrives at the room, gets behind the deck and the four start to perform. After the performance, the three go back to the same position as they were before the performance started and Mix Master Mike leaves.

The video was shot in the basement of 262 Mott Street in the Little Italy neighborhood of Manhattan, New York City. That was also where the Beastie Boys recorded Hello Nasty.

The alternate version of the song featured in the video is present on the Beastie Boys compilation album Beastie Boys Anthology: The Sounds of Science.

Charts

References

1998 songs
1999 singles
Beastie Boys songs
Song recordings produced by Mario Caldato Jr.